VIEW Conference is a computer graphics event in Italy and is held yearly in Turin, between October and November. Topics represented at the event include interactive techniques, digital cinema, 3D animation, gaming and VFX.

The event spans several days and includes sessions open to the public. The conference includes several international speakers from various sectors within the computer graphics field who present their work to the attendees as well as Master Classes and theory lessons taught by experts.

History 

The event was created in 2000 as Virtuality Conference. It changed its name for its eighth edition, in 2007, adopting the acronym VIEW, meaning "Virtual Interactive Emerging World".  The content of the conference has changed and evolved over the years as well.  While still focusing on "virtual reality", the VIEW Conference now includes emerging digital technology and applications including animation, special effects, virtual architecture, and videogames. Speakers of the various editions include Grant Major, Scott Farrar, Roger Guyett, John Knoll, Alvy Ray Smith, Glen Keane, Byron Howard,  Brad Lewis, Walter Murch, Mike Mitchell and Walt Dohrn.

In 2005 the VIEW Conference established the "VIEW Award", an international award for 3D animated and VFX short films, targeted to students, artists and filmmakers. As of 2016 the award has five categories,  Best Short, VIEW Social Contest ( aimed at involving visual artists, designers and computer graphics lovers with works using 2D/3D animation and/or VFX focusing on themes of social relevance), View Game Award, VIEWTube Video Award  and Italianmix.

See also 
 SIGGRAPH
 VIEW Fest
 Computer Graphics
 3D Cinema

References

External links 
 
 VIEWFest
 Ultify

Recurring events established in 2000
Computer graphics conferences
Festivals in Italy
Video game festivals
Science and technology in Italy
Culture in Turin
2000 establishments in Italy